The 2022–23 CONCACAF Nations League B is the second division of the 2022–23 edition of the CONCACAF Nations League, the second season of the international football competition involving the men's national teams of the 41 member associations of CONCACAF. It is being held from 2 June 2022 to 28 March 2023.

The top four teams in the Nations League B will qualify to the 2023 CONCACAF Gold Cup, and the next best four teams will enter the 2023 CONCACAF Gold Cup qualification.

Format 
League B will consist of sixteen teams. The league will be split into four groups of four teams. The teams will compete in a home-and-away, round-robin format over the course of the group phase, with matches being played in the official FIFA match windows in June 2022 and March 2023.

Team changes 
The following are the team changes of League B from the 2019–20 season:

Seeding 
The draw for the league phase took place in Miami, Florida, United States on 4 April 2022, 19:00 EDT. Each of the League's draws began by randomly selecting a team from Pot 1 and placing them in Group A of their respective league. The draws continued by selecting the remaining teams from Pot 1 and positioning them into Groups B, C and D in sequential order. The same procedure was done for the remaining pots. Teams were seeded into pots using CONCACAF Ranking.

Groups 
The fixture list was confirmed by CONCACAF on 6 April 2022.

All match times are in EDT (UTC−4) as listed by CONCACAF (local times, if different, are in parentheses).

Group A

Group B

Group C

Group D

Goalscorers

Notes

References

External links 

League B